Bromus bromoideus, the brome of the Ardennes, is a species of grass in the genus Bromus. Genetic studies suggest that it rather should be regarded as a variant of Bromus secalinus.

It was found in the calcareous meadows of the provinces of Liège and Luxembourg in Belgium, notably around the towns of Rochefort, Beauraing and Comblain-au-Pont, where it was first discovered in 1821. It was thought to be extinct since the 1930s until preserved seeds were rediscovered in collections of the Belgian National Botanic Garden by English botanist David Aplin and as a result of the publicity, seeds in other locations came to light in 2005.

In 2009 the National Botanic Garden of Belgium announced that some hundred thousand seeds have been germinated.

References

External links

bromoideus
Endemic flora of Belgium
Grasses of Europe
Plants extinct in the wild
Plants described in 1823